Feridun (from Persian Freydun, Proto-Iranian Θraitauna-) is a masculine given name. People with the name include:

Feridun Ahmed Bey (died 1583), Ottoman official, bureaucrat, author and military officer
Feridun Düzağaç (born 1968), popular Turkish rock music singer and songwriter
Feridun Cemal Erkin (1899–1980), Turkish diplomat and politician
Feridun Hamdullahpur, president and vice-chancellor of the University of Waterloo
Feridun Karakaya (1928–2004), well known Turkish comedy actor
Feridun Sungur (born 1984), Turkish professional footballer
Feridun Zaimoglu (born 1964), poet and visual artist of German Turkish origin

See also
 Özsoy (opera), the first Turkish opera composed during the republican period, is also called Feridun
Fereydun

Turkish masculine given names